Qujiang may refer to a number of places in the People's Republic of China.

 Qujiang District, Shaoguan (曲江区), Guangdong
 Qujiang District, Quzhou (衢江区), Zhejiang
 Qujiang, Jiangxi (曲江镇), town in Fengcheng
 Qujiang, Yunnan (曲江镇), town in Jianshui County
 Qujiang New District, Xi'an
 Qujiang Village, a tulou village in Shuyang, Nanjing County, Fujian (see also on Commons)